Raj Raj Singh Deo (26 April 1934 –  April 2004) was an Indian politician and the member of the royal Family of the former princely state of Patna in Odisha . He was member of Ganatantra Parishad political party and represented Bolangir loksabha constituency in 4th and 5th Lok Sabha.

Early life
Raj Raj Singh Deo was born to Rajendra Narayan Singh Deo, the ruler of the princely state of Patna and Rani Kailash Kumari Devi, daughter of Maharaja Bhupinder Singh of Patiala. He studied in the Mayo College in Ajmer and the Rajkumar College in Raipur.

Political career
He was elected to 4th and 5th Lok Sabha from Bolangir Constituency as member of Swatantra Party.

Personal life 
He was married to Premlata Devi and had 4 children (Kanak Vardhan Singh Deo, Mitrabinda Kumari Panwar, Vardhan Singh Deo, Satyarajeshwari Singh).

Notes

1934 births
2004 deaths
People from Balangir district
People from Odisha
India MPs 1967–1970
Swatantra Party politicians

Indian Hindus